Graham Ross (born 29 April 1985) is a British conductor and composer.

Early life and studies 
Ross was born in Surrey and began his training as a treble, pianist, organist and violinist.  He read music at Clare College, Cambridge, studying composition with Giles Swayne, and conducting at London's Royal College of Music, studying with Peter Stark and Robin O'Neill.  In 2004, whilst at Cambridge, he co-founded The Dmitri Ensemble, a performing group based around a string ensemble, of which he is Principal Conductor. In 2010, he made his BBC Proms debut, with opera work taking him to Jerusalem, Aldeburgh, and Musique-Cordiale, Provence. Ross held a conducting scholarship with the London Symphony Chorus from 2008 to 2009, and was Musical Director of Concordia Chamber Choir and Kingston Choral Society from 2008 to 2010. In 2010, he was appointed Fellow and Director of Music at Clare College, Cambridge.

Conductor 
Since 2010, Ross has directed the Choir of Clare College, Cambridge, with whom he has toured across Europe, the United States of America, Asia and Australia, including performances at Washington's Library of Congress and Sydney Opera House.  He has conducted Aalborg Symphony Orchestra, Aurora Orchestra, Australian Chamber Orchestra, Orchestra of the Age of Enlightenment, London Mozart Players and Southbank Sinfonia and worked with soloists Raphael Wallfisch, Richard Tognetti, Jennifer Pike, Laura van der Heijden and Guy Johnston.

Ross has conducted world premiere recordings by James MacMillan, Giles Swayne, Judith Bingham, Nico Muhly, Brett Dean, Matthew Martin and Imogen Holst, and premiere performances of works by Toby Hession, John Rutter, Cecilia McDowall, Gabriel Jackson, Jocelyn Pook and others.

Ross's discography with The Dmitri Ensemble and the Choir of Clare College, Cambridge for Naxos Records and, since 2010, Harmonia Mundi USA, has earned him Rising Star in BBC Music Magazine, a Gramophone Award nomination, a Diapason d'Or, Le Choix de France Musique, and Editor's Choice in Gramophone and BBC Music Magazine.  Ross has been Assistant Conductor and Chorus Master for Sir Roger Norrington, Diego Masson, Edward Gardner, Sir Mark Elder, Ivor Bolton, Lars Ulrik Mortensen and Sir Colin Davis.

Composer 
As a composer, Ross has written over one hundred works for a wide variety of genres that have been broadcast and performed by Aurora Orchestra, Australian Chamber Orchestra, Barry Humphries, BBC Concert Orchestra, saxophonist Anthony Brown, City of London Sinfonia, National Youth Choir of Great Britain, Park Lane Group, Patricia Rozario, Solstice Quartet, and many choirs in the UK.  He is published by Novello & Co, Oxford University Press, Encore Publications and the Associated Board of the Royal Schools of Music.

Other work 
Ross is Artistic Director of Fringe in the Fen, a biennial music and arts festival in Fenstanton, Cambridgeshire, raising funds for Macmillan Cancer Support. He is a Patron of the London Festival of Contemporary Church Music. Ross has worked extensively in outreach projects, including projects for Wigmore Hall, BBC Singers, Sue Perkins, and a song-writing project with Alzheimer's and dementia sufferers for English Touring Opera.  In 2015, he represented the UK as adjudicator for the Malta International Choir Festival. For 10 years he has been principal conductor at the Musique-Cordiale International Festival in the Pays de Fayence each August in France and at its UK concerts in Kent, UK, each autumn.

References

External links 
 Official website of Graham Ross
 Ikon Arts Management agency page on Ross

1985 births
Alumni of Clare College, Cambridge
English composers
English conductors (music)
British male conductors (music)
English violinists
Fellows of Clare College, Cambridge
Living people
British male violinists
21st-century British conductors (music)
21st-century violinists
21st-century British male musicians